Matanza (Spanish for "slaughter" or "killing") may refer to:
 La Matanza (1910–1920), a series of attacks and lynchings of Mexican ethnics by Anglo Texans between 1910 and 1920
 La Matanza, the 1932 Salvadoran peasant massacre
 Matanza Cueto, ring name for Guamanian professional wrestler Jeff Cobb
 Matanza Inc, a Brazilian  country/hardcore band formerly known as Matanza

Mattanza (Italian for "slaughter" or "killing") may refer to:
 Mattanza, a traditional form of tuna fishing practiced in Sicily and Sardinia
 Mattanza, a synonym in Sicily for the Second Mafia War.

Places 
Argentina
 La Matanza Partido, a district of Buenos Aires Province, Argentina
 Matanza River, Buenos Aires Province, Argentina

Colombia
 Matanza, Santander, a municipality of the Santander Department

Perú
 La Matanza District, a district in Morropón Province, Piura Region

Spain
 La Matanza de Acentejo, a municipality on Tenerife
 Matanza de los Oteros, a city in León, Spain

See also 
 Matanzas (disambiguation)